The Rembetika Hipsters are a Canadian band  based in Calgary, Alberta. They perform primarily Greek rebetiko music, as well as composing original music and exploring styles from Epirus, known as Epirotika, Smyrnaiko music from the region now known as Izmir, and Nisiotika music of the Greek islands.

History
The band began in 1996 with Nikos Diochnos (bouzouki, vocals) and Allen Baekeland (guitar and vocals).  Giorgos Iosifelis plays bass guitar, Lincoln Frey adds clarinet and melodeon,  Jonathan Lewis adds violin and baglamas and Malcolm Lim plays  hand percussion instruments such as darbuke. Brigitte Dajczer also played and recorded the violin from October 1999 to 2007. Other past members have included Danny Patton (bass), Ben Johnson (percussion), Jon Nordstrom (bass), and Edmond Agopian (violin).

By 1998 the band was performing locally in Calgary. In 2002 they began performing weekly at Calgary's Pegasus restaurant, and continued there for many years.

The group later performed at music festivals, concert halls, and small venues across Canada. They have traveled to Greece twice to play, reunite with family, and learn about the culture. They performed at the 2001 and 2007 Calgary Folk Music Festival. 

In 2011 the band released their third album, Kafeneion.

As of 2017, the Hipsters continue to perform in small venues around Alberta.

Discography

Studio albums

References

External links

 Rembetika Hipsters official website

Musical groups established in 1996
Musical groups from Calgary
Canadian world music groups
1996 establishments in Alberta